First Citizens (FCB) is a bank based in Trinidad and Tobago. First Citizens has over TT$38 billion in assets, 25 branches in Trinidad and three in Tobago and five in Barbados. It also has a representative office in Costa Rica, which handles its Latam business. It wholly owns First Citizens (St. Lucia) Limited, which it established as an offshore financial vehicle for the Bank and its subsidiaries and also to conduct selected banking and financial service operations in the Caribbean Region. The Group's Chief Executive Officer is Karen Darbasie and the office of Group Chief Financial Officer is held by Shiva Manraj.

First Citizens Group

Established in 1993, the First Citizens Group comprises:
First Citizens Bank Limited
First Citizens Asset Management Limited
First Citizens Trustee Services Limited
First Citizens (St. Lucia) Limited
First Citizens Financial Services (St. Lucia) Limited
First Citizens Securities Trading Limited
First Citizens Investment Services Limited  
First Citizens Investment Services (Barbados) Limited

See also 
 List of banks in the Americas

References

External links 

Banks of Trinidad and Tobago
Banks established in 1993